Llay Welfare Football Club is a Welsh football club based in the village of Llay, Wrexham County Borough, who were members of the Welsh National League (Wrexham Area) up until 2020. Formed in 1931, they began their football in the Wrexham and District League which they won in 1936–37 season. They now play in the Ardal Leagues North West, which is in the third tier of the Welsh football league system.

Former players
 Chris Armstrong

Honours

First Team
Welsh Amateur Cup - Winners: 1935-36
Welsh Amateur Cup - Runners-up: 1949-50
Welsh National League – Champions: 1962–63
North East Wales FA Challenge Cup  Winners: 1976–77
Wrexham and District League – Runners-up: 1936–37
Welsh National League – Runners-up: 1947–48, 1970–71
Welsh National League – Division One Champions: 1986–87, 1990–91
Welsh National League – Division One-Cup Winners: 1958–59

Reserves
Welsh National League – Division One Runners-up: 1996–97
Welsh National League – Division Two Champions: 2000–01
Welsh National League – Division Two Runners-up: 1996–97
Welsh National League – Division Two-Cup Winners: 1986–87, 1989–90, 2000–01, 2001–02
Welsh National League – Division 3A Runners-up: 1969–70

Colts
Welsh National League – Division Two-Cup Winners: 1996–97

References

External links
 Official website

Football clubs in Wales
Football clubs in Wrexham
Sport in Wrexham County Borough
Welsh National League (Wrexham Area) Premier Division clubs
Association football clubs established in 1930
1930 establishments in Wales
Ardal Leagues clubs